This is a list of characters from animated cartoon, comic books, webcomics and comic strips who are named after people.

Characters named after famous people
 Mayor Adam West in Family Guy, who is also dubbed by Adam West
 Alexander Lemming from The Beano – Alexander Fleming 
 Alexander Owlcott, a character in The Woods Are Full of Cuckoos – Alexander Woolcott 
 Alister from the anime Yu-Gi-Oh! was named after Aleister Crowley in the dub version (the character's original name is Amelda).
 Alvida of the anime and manga series One Piece gets her name from the female pirate Awilda
 Ann-Margrock, a Flintstones character – Ann-Margret
 Arnie Pie from The Simpsons – Ernie Pyle 
 Arpine Lusène – Arsène Lupin, a fictional character from Maurice Leblanc.
 Ax-hand Morgan of the anime and manga series One Piece gets his surname from Henry Morgan, a Welsh privateer who made a name in the Caribbean as a leader of buccaneers.
 Babbitt and Catstello, characters in A Tale of Two Kitties – Abbott and Costello.
 Baby Crockett, from The Beezer comic – Davy Crockett.
 Baby Face Finlayson, from The Beano comic – Baby Face Nelson.
 Professor Barabas, from Suske en Wiske – Barabbas, the biblical thief.
 Bartholomew Kuma from the anime and manga series One Piece is named after Welsh pirate Bartholomew Roberts.
 Basil Hawkins from the anime and manga series One Piece is named after both English Admiral Sir John Hawkins and English Doctor Basil Ringrose.
 Bellamy the Hyena from the anime and manga series One Piece is named after Samuel Bellamy, a formidable pirate in the early eighteenth century.
 Betty Savis, a character in She Was an Acrobat's Daughter – Bette Davis.
 Bing Crowsby, in The Woods Are Full of Cuckoos – Bing Crosby.
 Boa Hancock from the anime and manga series One Piece.
 Bogey Go Cart, a character in Bacall to Arms – Humphrey Bogart.
 Butch and Cassidy, villains from Pokémon – Butch Cassidy.
 Buzz Lightyear from Toy Story – Buzz Aldrin.
 Calamity James from The Beano comic – Calamity Jane.
 Calamity Jane from Lucky Luke – Calamity Jane.
 Calvin from Calvin and Hobbes – John Calvin, 16th century theologian
 Capone Bege from the anime and manga series One Piece is named after Al Capone and William le Sauvage.
 Cary Granite, a Flintstones character – Cary Grant
 Casey Strangle, a Flintstones character – Casey Stengel.
 Cecil Crumey from Code Geass – novelist Andrew Crumey.
 Char Aznable (Mobile Suit Gundam through Char's Counterattack). Rumored to be named after French lounge singer Charles Aznavour.
 Chilly Willy – Chill Wills, actor.
 Chuck, from Adolescent Radioactive Black Belt Hamsters comic book – Chuck Norris.
 Clark Gravel, a Flintstones character – Clark Gable.
 Clint, from Adolescent Radioactive Black Belt Hamsters comic book – Clint Eastwood.
 Darwin Watterson, from The Amazing World of Gumball – Charles Darwin.
 Dewey, one of "Huey, Dewey and Louie" – Thomas Dewey, American politician.
 Dick Fowl, a character in The Woods Are Full of Cuckoos – Dick Powell.
 Dina Saur from Beany and Cecil. A singing dinosaur named after Dinah Shore a popular female singer on TV at that time.
 Dio Brando is named after both Ronnie James Dio and Marlon Brando.
 Dole Promise, a character from She Was an Acrobat's Daughter – Lowell Thomas.
 Donatello, the second youngest of the ninja turtle brothers from TMNT – the Italian Renaissance artist and sculptor, Donatello.
 Donquixote Doflamingo from the anime and manga series One Piece is named after the a character from Spanish film of the same name Don Quixote.
 X. Drake from the anime and manga series One Piece is named after the famous English naval Vice Adm. Francis Drake, who was known as a pirate the Spanish.
 Duck Dodgers, played by Daffy Duck, was named after famous character Buck Rogers.
 Ed G. Robemsome, a character in Thugs with Dirty Mugs – Edward G. Robinson.
 Egroeg Sacul, Star Tours at the Disney's Hollywood Studios, named after Star Wars creator George Lucas. Egroeg Sacul is George Lucas spelled backwards.
 Empoleon from Pokémon – Napoleon Bonaparte, the French Emperor
 Eustass Kid from the anime and manga series One Piece is named after the mercenary Eustace the Monk and the Scottish privateer William Kid.
 Fats Swallow, a character in The Woods Are Full of Cuckoos – Fats Waller.
 Foghorn Leghorn, Warner Brothers cartoons – Senator Claghorn, regular character on The Fred Allen Show
 Francesca Lucchini from the anime Strike Witches, named after Italian World War 2 fighter pilot Franco Lucchini.
 Frankie Stein, from the Wham!, Shiver and Shake, Whoopee! and Monster Fun comics. – Frankenstein
 Fred Bonaparte, from the game Psychonauts – his apparent ancestor, Napoleon Bonaparte.
 Fred McFurry, a character in The Woods Are Full of Cuckoos – Fred MacMurray.
 Gloria Von Gouten, from the game Psychonauts, named after the famous actor, Gloria Swanson.
 Goddard, the robot dog of Jimmy Neutron, is named for rocket scientist Robert Goddard
 Helga G. Pataki of "Hey Arnold!", named after former governor George Pataki.
 Huey Freeman from The Boondocks is named after Huey P. Newton
 Huey, one of "Huey, Dewey and Louie" – Huey Pierce Long, American politician
 Hitmonlee from Pokémon – Bruce Lee, martial artist
 Hitmonchan from Pokémon – Jackie Chan, martial artist
 Hobbes from Calvin and Hobbes – Thomas Hobbes, 17th century philosopher
 Hohenheim of Light, from Fullmetal Alchemist – Paracelsus, sixteenth-century alchemist, whose real name was Theophrastus Van Hohenheim
 Hubert Farnsworth from Futurama – Philo Farnsworth
 Huckleberry Hound – Huckleberry Finn, The Adventures of Huckleberry Finn
 Iago from Aladdin – Iago, William Shakespeare's play Othello.
 Ivy the Terrible, from The Beano comic – Ivan the Terrible.
 Jack Bunny, a character in I Love to Singa – Jack Benny.
 Jackie Chan from Jackie Chan Adventures – Jackie Chan
 Jackie, from Adolescent Radioactive Black Belt Hamsters comic book – Jackie Chan
 James Isaac Neutron from The Adventures of Jimmy Neutron, Boy Genius – Isaac Newton, English scientist, and James Chadwick, who was nicknamed "Jimmy Neutron".
 Jeffy Dahmer, of The Ringer – Jeffery Dahmer the serial killer
 Jerom, of Suske en Wiske – Jeroom Verten – Belgian playwright.
 Jessie and James, villains from Pokémon named after Jesse James.
 Jewelry Bonney from the anime and manga series One Piece is named after Irish female pirate Anne Bonny.
 Jimmy Darrock, a Flintstones character – singer James Darren.
 John D. Rockerduck – John D. Rockefeller.
 Jules and Verne, the sons of Doctor Emmett Brown in Back to the Future: The Animated Series, are named after Jules Verne.
  Kangaskhan from some Western localizations of Pokémon – Genghis Khan, the Mongol Emperor
 The Koopalings are named after musicians.
 Laffite from the anime and manga series One Piece is named after French pirate Jean Lafitte.
 Lapras from Pokémon – Laplace, a mathematician.
 Laurie Be Cool, a character in Bacall to Arms – Lauren Bacall.
 Leonardo, the oldest of the Teenage Mutant Ninja Turtles – the great Italian Renaissance artist and scientist, Leonardo da Vinci
 Leo Ferocious, a Flintstones character – Leo Durocher.
 Lester Coward, a character in She Was an Acrobat's Daughter – Leslie Howard.
 Ludvig from Hey Arnold! – Ludwig van Beethoven
 Ludwig Von Drake – Ludwig van Beethoven.
 Marge Simpson (born Marge Bouvier) – Jacqueline Lee Bouvier Kennedy Onassis, former First Lady of the United States, widow to John F. Kennedy and Aristotle Onassis.
 Marshall D. Teach, Thatch, and Edward Newgate from the anime and manga series One Piece are named after Edward Teach, better known as Blackbeard, who was a notorious English pirate in the Caribbean Sea and western Atlantic during the early 18th century.
 Michelangelo, the youngest of the ninja turtle brothers from TMNT – the great Italian Renaissance artist and sculptor, Michelangelo Buonarroti
 Milhouse Van Houten, a character on The Simpsons – Richard Milhous Nixon, see BBC Simpson's page.  Milhouse's middle name Mussolini is based on Italian dictator Benito Mussolini.
 Mickey Mouse – Mickey Rooney claims it was named after him (see cartoon character's page for the official origin).
 Milton Squirrel, in The Woods Are Full of Cuckoos – Milton Berle.
 Morlocks – in Marvel Comics, a group of mutants naming themselves after the futuristic race in H.G. Wells' The Time Machine
 Nebby K. Nezzer from Veggie Tales is named after Nebuchadnezzar
 Nemo from the movie Finding Nemo – Captain Nemo, fictional character in Jules Verne's novels 20,000 Leagues under the Sea and The Mysterious Island.
 Nero – Nero, Belgian comic character by Marc Sleen is named after the Roman emperor Nero.
 Nina Einstein from Code Geass – Albert Einstein.
 Oscar from Cerebus – named after poet and playwright Oscar Wilde.
 Owl Jolson, a character in I Love to Singa – Al Jolson.
 Pepé Le Pew, French skunk in Warner Brothers cartoons – Pepe le Moko, fictional character from the novel and movies of the same name.
 Philip J. Fry, from Futurama – Phil Hartman, voice actor.
 Raphael, the second oldest of the ninja turtle brothers from TMNT, was named after the Italian Renaissance artist and sculptor, Raphael Sanzio
 Richard the Lion, from The Beano comic – Richard the Lionheart
 Rip Van Wink, from The Beano comic – Rip van Winkle
 Rock Lee from Naruto is named after Bruce Lee.
 Rock Quarry – Flintstones character named after actor Rock Hudson.
 Roronoa Zoro from the anime and manga series One Piece is named after French pirate François l'Olonnais and fictional hero/vigilante Zorro.
 Rubberduck, comic book character from Captain Carrot and His Amazing Zoo Crew, is the secret identity of actor Byrd Rentals, named after Burt Reynolds.
 Scrooge McDuck – Ebenezer Scrooge, fictional character in Charles Dickens' A Christmas Carol
 Seymour Skinner is named after B.F. Skinner.
 Sigmund (Dutch comics character) –  Sigmund Freud, Austrian psychiatrist.
 Sophie Turkey, a character in The Woods Are Full of Cuckoos – Sophie Tucker.
 Stony Curtis, a Flintstones character – Tony Curtis.
 Sweeny Toddler, from the Shiver and Shake, Whoopee! and Buster comics – Sweeney Todd
 Tony Zucco – Rumored to be named after the actor George Zucco
 Trafalgar Law from the anime and manga series One Piece's last name Law is based on notorious English pirate Edward Low. His first name is from the Battle of Trafalgar.
 Troy McClure from The Simpsons – Troy Donahue and Doug McClure
 Tycho Brahe, from Penny Arcade – Tycho Brahe, sixteenth-century astronomer
 Victor and Hugo, from The Hunchback of Notre Dame (Disney film) – Victor Hugo, author of The Hunchback of Notre Dame.
 Victor and Hugo, the Cosgrove Hall Films characters, are also named after the author.
 W.C. Fieldmouse – W.C. Fields.
 Wolfgang from Hey Arnold! – Wolfgang Amadeus Mozart.
 Woodhouse, the butler from Archer, is named for British author P.G. Wodehouse, who created the famous fictional butler, Jeeves.
 Woody from Toy Story – Woody Strode.
 Yankee Poodle, comic book character from Captain Carrot and His Amazing Zoo Crew, is the secret identity of Rova Barkitt, named after gossip columnist Rona Barrett.
 Yensid, from Fantasia, after Walt Disney. Yensid is Disney spelled backwards.
 Yogi Bear – Yogi Berra, baseball player.

Characters named after non-famous people
 Bugs Bunny from Looney Tunes – Ben "Bugs" Hardaway, storyboard artist
 Homer Simpson, Marge Simpson, Lisa Simpson and Maggie Simpson of The Simpsons are named after the family members of creator Matt Groening: his father Homer, his mother Marge and his sisters Lisa and Maggie.
 Garfield is named after Jim Davis's grandfather, James Garfield Davis (who is named after James Abram Garfield)
 Jeff Fischer, from American Dad! is named after Seth MacFarlane's good friend with the same name.
 Louie, one of "Huey, Dewey and Louie" – Louie Schmitt, animator
 Alvin, Simon, and Theodore (The Chipmunks), are named after the executives of their original record label, Liberty Records: Alvin Bennett (the president), Theodore Keep (the chief engineer), and Simon Waronker (the founder and owner).
 Timmy Turner from The Fairly OddParents – Timmy Hartman (younger brother of Butch Hartman)
 Charlie Brown and Linus, from Peanuts, were named after friends of Charles Schulz from Art Instruction Inc., where Schulz taught before and at the beginning of his cartoon career.
 Cree Lincoln, from Codename: Kids Next Door, is named after her voice actress, Cree Summer.
 Lois Lane, from the Superman comics, is named after Lois Amster, a girl that Jerry Siegel had a crush on.
 Bullwinkle J. Moose is named after Clarence Bullwinkel, a friend of Jay Ward and Alex Anderson, who created Bullwinkle. The J in his name is for his creator Jay Ward, as the J in Homer Simpson's middle name was Matt Groening's way of honoring Jay Ward.
 Pocoyo, the main protagonist of the TV show "Pocoyo", named after his three-year-old daughter used it in her nightly prayers saying "Eres niño poco yo" ("You're a child little me") instead of "Eres niño como yo ("You're a child like me").
 Super Zia (from Toothpique Productions' series of the same title) is named after the actor playing him, a friend of the director's, Ziauddin Md. Nasrullah.
 Erfaan a.k.a. Mr. 85 (from Toothpique Productions' Super Zia) is named after a friend of the director's girlfriend.
 Shinji Ikari from Neon Genesis Evangelion is named after Shinji Higuchi, head of Gainax, the animation studio of Evangelion.
 Kirby is named after lawyer John Kirby, who defended Nintendo in the Universal City Studios, Inc. v. Nintendo Co., Ltd. case in 1984.
 Porky Pig from Looney Tunes is named two childhood classmates of creator Friz Freleng, nicknamed "Porky" and "Piggy."
 Mario is named after Nintendo of America's warehouse landlord Mario Segale.

References

 
Comic and cartoon characters